Sphaeromeria is a genus of flowering plants in the chamomile tribe within the sunflower family.

Sphaeromeria is native to the western United States and northwestern Mexico. Species are known generally as chickensages. The genus is closely related to Artemisia, and some authors merge the two genera into one.

 Species
 Sphaeromeria argentea - silver chickensage - CO  ID MT WY NV 
 Sphaeromeria cana - gray chickensage - OR CA NV 
 Sphaeromeria capitata - rock tansy - MT WY CO UT 
 Sphaeromeria compacta - compact chickensage - NV 
 Sphaeromeria diversifolia - separateleaf chickensage - NV UT 
 Sphaeromeria martirensis - 	Baja California
 Sphaeromeria potentilloides - fivefinger chickensage - CA NV OR ID 
 Sphaeromeria ruthiae - Zion chickensage - UT 
 Sphaeromeria simplex - Laramie chickensage - WY

References

External links

 Jepson Manual Treatment

Anthemideae
Asteraceae genera
Flora of North America